Erich  Adolf Dunskus (27 July 1890 – 25 November 1967) was a German film actor. He appeared in 170 films between 1927 and 1966. He was born in Pillkallen, East Prussia and died in Hagen, Germany.

Selected filmography

 The King of Paris (1930)
 Bobby Gets Going (1931)
 Girls to Marry (1932)
 Secret Agent (1932)
 Overnight Sensation (1932)
 And Who Is Kissing Me? (1933)
 So Ended a Great Love (1934)
 Paganini (1934)
 The Girl from the Marsh Croft (1935)
  The Saint and Her Fool (1935)
 Pygmalion (1935)
 City of Anatol (1936)
 Savoy Hotel 217 (1936)
 Family Parade (1936)
 Love's Awakening (1936)
 Der Kaiser von Kalifornien (1936)
 Tomfoolery (1936)
 Woman's Love—Woman's Suffering (1937)
 Capers (1937)
 Don't Promise Me Anything (1937)
 The Man Who Was Sherlock Holmes (1937)
 Seven Slaps (1937)
 Serenade (1937)
 Men Without a Fatherland (1937)
The Chief Witness (1937)
 Love Can Lie (1937)
 Tango Notturno (1937)
 The Divine Jetta (1937)
 The Broken Jug (1937)
 Monika (1938)
 Dance on the Volcano (1938)
 Secret Code LB 17 (1938)
 The Impossible Mister Pitt (1938)
 Shadows Over St. Pauli (1938)
 The Blue Fox (1938)
 Uproar in Damascus (1939)
 Detours to Happiness (1939)
 D III 88 (1939)
 Midsummer Night's Fire (1939)
 The False Step (1939)
 In the Name of the People (1939)
  Her First Experience (1939)
 Robert Koch (1939)
 Twilight (1940)
 Between Hamburg and Haiti (1940)
 Counterfeiters (1940)
 Jud Süß (1940)
 Friedemann Bach (1941)
 What Does Brigitte Want? (1941)
 The Swedish Nightingale (1941)
 The Great Love (1942)
 Love Me (1942)
 The Big Game (1942)
 Beloved World (1942)
 The Golden Spider (1943)
 Paracelsus (1943)
 Summer Nights (1944)
 A Wife for Three Days (1944)
 Under the Bridges (1946)
 No Place for Love (1947)
  The Court Concert (1948)
 Morituri (1948)
 Don't Dream, Annette (1949)
 Quartet of Five (1949)
 The Cuckoos (1949)
 Girls Behind Bars (1949)
 The Great Mandarin (1949)
 Bürgermeister Anna (1950)
  Melody of Fate (1950)
  The Woman from Last Night (1950)
 The Sinful Border (1951)
 When the Heath Dreams at Night (1952)
 Red Roses, Red Lips, Red Wine (1953)
 Captain Wronski (1954)
 Die Ratten (1955)
 Before God and Man (1955)
 A Heart Returns Home (1956)
 My Father, the Actor (1956)
 The Heart of St. Pauli (1957)
 It Happened Only Once (1958)
 A Thousand Stars Aglitter (1959)
 Marili (1959)
 Barbara (1961)

References

External links

1890 births
1967 deaths
20th-century German male actors
People from Krasnoznamensky District
People from East Prussia
German male film actors
German male silent film actors